Embleton railway station was situated on the Cockermouth, Keswick and Penrith Railway between Penrith and Cockermouth in Cumberland (now in Cumbria), England. The station served the village of Embleton. The station opened to passenger traffic on 2 January 1865, and closed on 15 September 1958.

Two camping coaches were positioned here by the London Midland Region in 1954.

All trace of the station building has gone although the Station Master's house survives as a private residence on the side of the A66.

References

Further reading
 
 

Disused railway stations in Cumbria
Former Cockermouth, Keswick and Penrith Railway stations
Railway stations in Great Britain opened in 1865
Railway stations in Great Britain closed in 1958
Allerdale